The 2022 Arctic Race of Norway was a road cycling stage race that took place between 11 and 14 August 2022. It was the ninth edition of the Arctic Race of Norway, which is rated as a 2.Pro event on the 2022 UCI Europe Tour and the 2022 UCI ProSeries calendars.

Teams 
Six UCI WorldTeams, ten UCI ProTeams, and three UCI Continental teams made up the nineteen teams that participated in the race.

UCI WorldTeams

 
 
 
 
 
 

UCI ProTeams

 
 
 
 
 
 
 
 
 
 

UCI Continental Teams

 China Glory Continental Cycling Team

Route

Stages

Stage 1 
11 August 2022 – Mo i Rana to Mo i Rana,

Stage 2 
12 August 2022 – Mosjøen to Brønnøysund,

Stage 3 
13 August 2022 – Namsos to Skallstuggu summit (Levanger),

Stage 4 
14 August 2022 – Trondheim to Trondheim,

Classification leadership table

Classification standings

General classification

Points classification

Mountains classification

Young rider classification

Team classification

References

External links 
 

2022
Arctic Race of Norway
Arctic Race of Norway
Arctic Race of Norway
Arctic Race of Norway